Indomyrma is an Asian genus of ants in the subfamily Myrmicinae. The genus contains two species: the type species Indomyrma dasypyx known from India and Indomyrma bellae known from Vietnam.

Species
 Indomyrma bellae Zryanin, 2012
 Indomyrma dasypyx Brown, 1986

References

External links

Myrmicinae
Ant genera
Hymenoptera of Asia